Barrio de las Ollas is a locality located in the municipality of Boñar, in León province, Castile and León, Spain. As of 2020, it has a population of 35.

Geography 
Barrio de las Ollas is located 49km north-northeast of León, Spain.

References

Populated places in the Province of León